Joice George (born 26 April 1970) is an Indian politician and a Member of Parliament of the 16th Lok Sabha of India.
He represented the Idukki constituency of Kerala having contested as a CPI(M)-supported independent.

References

Living people
India MPs 2014–2019
Independent politicians in India
Lok Sabha members from Kerala
People from Idukki district
1970 births
Communist Party of India (Marxist) politicians from Kerala